The 71st Rescue Squadron is part of the 347th Rescue Group at Moody Air Force Base, Georgia.  It flies HC-130J Combat King II aircraft conducting search and rescue missions.

Mission
The 71st Rescue Squadron maintains combat-ready status as the last active duty Lockheed HC-130J Combat King II, combat search and rescue squadron.  The squadron deploys expeditionary forces to execute personnel recovery operations worldwide to support theater commanders to advance national security interests.  This mission requires the squadron to conduct low-level operations and air refueling using night vision goggles and airdrop pararescue personnel of other units for in support of combat personnel recovery.

History

Alaskan operations
The 71st was first activated in November 1952 when Air Rescue Service expanded its existing air rescue squadrons to groups and expanded their flights to separate squadrons.  It flew search, rescue and recovery missions out of Elmendorf Air Force Base from 1952 to 1960 and 1970–1991. It has flown aerial refueling missions for search and rescue operations since 1991.

Reactivation in the Southeast
The squadron has supported the combat search and rescue mission in Southwest Asia with aircraft and crews since 1992.  In August 2014, the 71st completed its last deployment with the HC-130P Combat King aircraft, which it has flown since 2003.  This was the last deployment by an active duty squadron with the Combat King model.  The squadron is now beginning to transition to the HC-130J Combat King II by September 2015.

Lineage
 Constituted as the 71st Air Rescue Squadron on 17 October 1952
 Activated on 14 November 1952
 Discontinued and inactivated on 18 March 1960
 Redesignated 71st Aerospace Rescue and Recovery Squadron on 25 November 1969
 Activated on 8 March 1970
 Redesignated 71st Air Rescue Squadron on 1 June 1989
 Inactivated on 1 June 1991
 Activated on 1 October 1991
 Redesignated 71st Rescue Squadron on 1 February 1993

Assignments
 10th Air Rescue Group: 14 November 1952 (attached to Alaskan Air Command for operations after 1 August 1954)
 Air Rescue Service: 21 October 1957 – 18 March 1960 (continued attachment to Alaskan Air Command until 23 May 1958)
 39th Aerospace Rescue and Recovery Wing: 8 March 1970 (attached to Detachment 1, 39th Aerospace Rescue and Recovery Wing until 30 June 1971, Elmendorf Rescue Coordination Center until 24 June 1972, Alaskan Air Command Rescue Coordination Center)
 41st Aerospace Rescue and Recovery Wing (later 41st Rescue and Weather Reconnaissance Wing): 1 July 1974 (continued attachment to Alaskan Air Command Rescue Coordination Center)
 Air Rescue Service: 1 August 1989 – 1 June 1991 (continued attachment to Alaskan Air Command Rescue Coordination Center)
 Air Rescue Service: 1 October 1991
 1st Operations Group: 1 February 1993
 1st Rescue Group: 14 June 1995
 347th Rescue Group: 1 April 1997 – Present

Stations
 Elmendorf Air Force Base, Alaska, 14 November 1952 – 18 March 1960
 Elmendorf Air Force Base, Alaska, 8 March 1970 – 1 June 1991
Patrick Air Force Base, Florida, 1 October 1991
Moody Air Force Base, Georgia, 1 April 1997 – Present

Aircraft

Grumman SA-16 Albatross (1952–1960)
Sikorsky H-5 Dragonfly (1954–1955)
Douglas C-54 Skymaster (1954–1955)
Sikirsky SH-19 Chickasaw (1954–1956)
Douglas SC-54 Skymaster (1955–1958)
Piasecki SH-21 Workhorse (1956–1960)
Lockheed HC-130 Hercules (1970–1987, 1991 – present)
 Lockheed HC-130P Combat King, 2003-c. 2014
Sikirsky HH-3 Jolly Green Giant (1975–1991)
Sikorsky CH-3 (1976–1979, 1981–1990)

Awards and Campaigns

See also

References

Notes

Bibliography

071